Frank Talbott was an American Negro league pitcher in the 1900s.

Talbott made his Negro leagues debut in 1907 with the Indianapolis ABCs. He played for the Leland Giants the following season, then returned to the ABCs in 1909.

References

External links
Baseball statistics and player information from Baseball-Reference Black Baseball Stats and Seamheads

Year of birth missing
Year of death missing
Place of birth missing
Place of death missing
Indianapolis ABCs players
Leland Giants players
Baseball pitchers